Bella Vista Private School is a K–12 private school in Scottsdale, Arizona, United States. It was founded in 2004, first as a middle school then expanding over time.

The school has moved locations over the years. It moved from Cave Creek, Arizona to rented units next to Cactus Shadows High School. It now will be using the closed Desert Arroyo Middle School, also rented from the Cave Creek Unified School District.

References

Private high schools in Arizona